Origanum amanum, the Amanum oregano, is a species of flowering plant in the family Lamiaceae, native to the Hatay Province of southern Turkey, bordering on Syria.

This plant is used as a culinary herb and as ornamental groundcover in sunny, well-drained situations. Preferring alkaline soil, it tolerates poor soil but dislikes winter wetness. It has gained the Royal Horticultural Society's Award of Garden Merit.

The specific epithet amanum refers to the Amanus Mountains in Turkey, where the plant is found.

References

Plants described in 1895
Flora of Turkey
amanum
Garden plants